The men's singles figure skating at the 1999 Asian Winter Games was held on 3 and 4 February 1999 at the Yongpyong Indoor Ice Rink, South Korea.

Schedule
All times are Korea Standard Time (UTC+09:00)

Results

References

Results

External links
Schedule

Men